Complete results for Women's Slalom competition at the 2011 World Championships, run on Saturday, February 19. The tenth race of the championships, its first run at 10:00 local time (CET) and the second run 13:30.
A total of 111 athletes from 46 countries competed.

Results

References

Slalom, women's
2011 in German women's sport
FIS